Sanjiang is a town of Xinhui District, in the southern suburbs of Jiangmen, Guangdong, People's Republic of China, located  from downtown Jiangmen. , it has one residential community and 12 villages under its administration. It borders Mujing to the east, Gujing to the south, Shuangshui to the west across Yinzhou Lake, and Lile Subdistrict to the north.

See also
List of township-level divisions of Guangdong

References

Towns in Guangdong
Xinhui District